Villeta is a municipality and town in Cundinamarca (Colombia), located in Gualivá Province, approximately  northwest of Bogota, considered the capital of the province. Its name means "Little Village". The municipality borders Quebradanegra and Nimaima in the north, Nocaima and Sasaima in the east, Albán and Vianí in the south and Guaduas in the west.

History 
The region of Villeta before the Spanish conquest was inhabited by the Panche. Modern Villeta was founded as Villa de San Miguel on September 29, 1551 by Alonso de Olalla and Hernando de Alcocer.

Main economic activities in Villeta are related with sugar cane derivatives and as an important tourist center for people from Bogotá due to its warm climate, including ecologic trails, cascades and hotels.

Geology 
The Villeta Group comprising the Conejo, La Frontera, Simijaca, Hiló, Capotes, Socotá,  El Peñón and Trincheras Formations is named after Villeta.

Gallery

References

Bibliography 
 
 

Municipalities of Cundinamarca Department
Populated places established in 1551
1551 establishments in the Spanish Empire